WORLD TOUR 1980 is a live album by Yellow Magic Orchestra. It was recorded during the band's 1980 international tour (their second after the 1979 Trans Atlantic Tour). This is the only YMO live album to include songs originally released on X∞Multiplies; it also features six songs from YMO members made for other projects and two covers. It was released, with a book with photographs taken during the tour, as both a 2-CD set and a 3-LP set (with 3–5 songs spread over 5 sides), which had a bonus track. "Jiseiki Hirake Kokoro" was originally made for a Fujifilm cassette commercial. It was included in Snakeman Show's self-titled album in mono so that the lyrics, which reference Fujifilm cassettes, could not be understood properly; it was presented here in stereo, and was included in the UC YMO compilation.

Track listing 
All tracks arranged by YMO, except "Maps" & "Jiseiki Hirake Kokoro" by YMO with Kenji Omura, "Zai Kung Tong Boy" & "Tong Poo" by Akiko Yano and "Invention" by the Roland Corporation and Hideki Matsutake.

Track information 
 "Riot in Lagos" was originally included in Sakamoto's 1980 album B-2 Unit.
 "The End of Asia" is performed in the style of Sakamoto's version from his 1978 album Thousand Knives.
 "Maps" was originally included in Omura's 1981 album Spring is Nearly Here.
 "The Core of Eden" was originally included in Takahashi's 1980 album Murdered by the Music.
 "Zai Kung Tong Boy" (also known as "Kang Tong Boy") was originally included in Yano's 1980 album Gohan ga Dekita yo.
 "1000 Knives" was originally included in Thousand Knives and was included later on YMO's 1981 album BGM.
 "Tong Poo" is performed in the style of Yano's version from Gohan ga Dekita yo.
 "Invention" is a fast-paced rendition of Bach's "Invention No. 1" (BWV 772), a demo song that was listed on the Roland MC-8 manual.

Personnel 
 Haruomi Hosono – Bass (Music Man StingRay) on "Tong Poo", Synth bass (Sequential Circuits Prophet-5, ARP Odyssey Mk II)
 Ryuichi Sakamoto – Keyboards (Prophet-5, ARP Odyssey Mk III, Polymoog, Roland Jupiter-4), Vocoder (Roland VP-330) on "Behind the Mask", Drum machine (Linn LM-1)
 Yukihiro Takahashi – Drums, Electronic drums (Ult-Sound DS-4 Custom, Pollard Syndrum 477), Lead vocals on "Nice Age", "The Core of Eden", "Citizens of Science", "La Femme Chinoise", "Solid State Survivor", "Radio Junk" and "All You Need is Love"
 Hideki Matsutake – Modular synthesizer (Moog IIIC, Moog Modular Model 15, Korg PS-3100, E-mu Modular 2000), Sequencer (Roland MC-4B, MC-8), Programming
 Akiko Yano – Keyboards (Prophet-5, Oberheim Eight Voice), Backing vocals on "Nice Age", "Solid State Survivor", "Radio Junk" and "All You Need is Love", Lead Vocals on "Zai Kung Tong Boy"
 Kenji Omura – Guitar (Fender Stratocaster), Lead vocals on "Maps", Backing vocals on "Nice Age", "Solid State Survivor", "Radio Junk" and "All You Need is Love"
Tomoko Ebe Nunoi – Sampled Sexy Voice on "La Femme Chinoise"

Technical personnel 
 Kimitoshi Sato – Supervising, Planning, Selection, Compilation
 Mitsuo Koike – Mixing
 Yukimasa Okumura – Art Direction
 Masaki Yoshimi, Nobuo Yoshida/THE STUDIO TOKYO JAPAN INC. – Design
 Yukihiro Takahashi/BRICKS-MONO – Costume Design
 Nobuo Yoshida – Copy Coordination
 Kenji Narukawa – Coordination Support
 Shiro Tsubata/ALFA MUSIC – Manager
 Mikio Honoda, Kenji Miura, Toshi Yajima, Hiro Ito, Junichi Takahashi, Tetsuo Tanaka, Tomoaki Sato/FUJIHOUSE, Hiroshi Tanaka/NHK, Miki Tayama, Kazuhiko Naruze/TIGHTEN UP and ALL BEAUTIFUL YMO FREAKS – Special Thanks

External links 
 
 

Yellow Magic Orchestra albums
Alfa Records live albums
1980 live albums